Nduka Emmanuel Odizor (born 28 August 1958) is a former tennis player from Nigeria, who represented his native country at the 1988 Summer Olympics in Seoul. He won one career title in singles (Taipei, 1983) and seven doubles titles. He reached his highest ATP singles ranking of world No. 52 in June 1984 and reached No. 20 in doubles in August 1984. Between 1986 and 1993 he played in 11 ties for the Nigerian Davis Cup team and compiled a 20–13 win-loss record.

Career finals

Singles (1 win)

Doubles (7 wins, 4 losses)

References

External links
 
 
 

1958 births
Living people
Sportspeople from Lagos
Nigerian male tennis players
Tennis players at the 1988 Summer Olympics
Olympic tennis players of Nigeria
African Games medalists in tennis
African Games gold medalists for Nigeria
African Games bronze medalists for Nigeria
Competitors at the 1978 All-Africa Games
20th-century Nigerian people
21st-century Nigerian people